The Wells Fargo Center (previously known as Met 2 Financial Center) is part of the Metropolitan Miami complex in the central business district of Downtown Miami, Florida. It was completed in 2010 and is the ninth tallest building in Miami, as well as the tenth in Florida.

The Wells Fargo Center is adjacent to the JW Marriott Marquis Miami, a 31-story,  building which is occupied by a JW Marriott Hotel building. The two structures are connected to each other via a parking garage.

The Metropolitan Miami project gained attention due to NBA star Shaquille O'Neal's involvement in the project. In 2006, he formed the O'Neal Group, a building-development company. The Metropolitan Miami project was the group's first project.

Tenants
Greenberg Traurig
Silversea Cruises

Gallery

See also
Metropolitan Miami (development)
JW Marriott Marquis Miami
Met 1
Met 3
 List of tallest buildings in Florida

References

External links
Met Miami on Emporis

Office buildings completed in 2010
Skyscraper office buildings in Miami
Wells Fargo buildings
2010 establishments in Florida